Vezac may refer to:

 Vézac, Cantal, a commune of the Cantal département, France
 Vézac, Dordogne, a commune of the Dordogne département, France
 Vezac, Croatia, a village near Primošten